Olivia Cheng is a Canadian actress, broadcast journalist, and former correspondent for Entertainment Tonight Canada. Some of her roles include concubine Mei Lin in Marco Polo, sinister Master Gao in Deadly Class, Ah Toy (a madam in San Francisco's Chinatown) in the 1870s set martial arts crime drama series Warrior, Dr. Sylvia Wen (Boulder Free Zone's main doctor) in the 2021 adaptation of Stephen King's The Stand and warrior Charlotte in the dystopian series See.

Early life
Cheng was born in Edmonton, Alberta to parents who immigrated from Guangdong. They were part of a co-founding group of Chinese parents that created the Edmonton Mandarin Bilingual program within the city's public school system. Her father worked in software and her mother was a health aide.

Cheng enrolled in her first acting class at age six, and booked her first commercial at age nineteen. She attended NAIT's Radio and Television Arts program the following year. After finishing school, she became a videographer for Global TV Lethbridge, before moving back to Edmonton to work as a broadcast and print journalist. She went on to freelance as a correspondent for ET Canada.

Career 
In the mid-2000s, AMC was launching its original content division and came to Alberta with a Walter Hill-helmed mini-series executive produced by Robert Duvall. They were looking for five Chinese actresses, and were willing to consider amateurs. Duvall saw Cheng's audition and asked to bring her back. She was subsequently cast in Broken Trail (2006), which was nominated for 16 Primetime Emmy Awards and won four, including the Emmy for Outstanding Mini Series. 

In 2007, Cheng portrayed Iris Chang in the documentary Iris Chang: The Rape of Nanking, based on Chang's best-selling 1997 book The Rape of Nanking.

Cheng has appeared on Supernatural and Eureka, as well as the episode "The New World" on the television show The 4400. In 2013, she appeared as Linda Park in the TV series Arrow. 

In 2014, Cheng landed a role in Netflix's series Marco Polo. It was a lavish television drama, one of the most expensive ever produced, about Marco Polo’s journey as he travels from his home in Venice to the court of Kublai Khan, where he finds himself in the middle of a war in 13th-century China. Cheng portrayed Mei Lin, a concubine and assassin, the sister of Jia Sidao. Cheng joked in a December 2014 interview that owing to her frequent nude scenes in Marco Polo, she would not be watching the series with her parents.

In October 2017, it was announced Cheng would be part of the main cast of the Justin Lin-produced Warrior, set against the backdrop of the Tong Wars of San Francisco. In the series Cheng portrays Ah Toy, a madam in  San Francisco's Chinatown during the 1870s, which is a fictionalised version of the real Ah Toy. The series was based on an original idea by the late Bruce Lee and premiered on Cinemax on April 5, 2019.

Filmography

References

External links
 
 Olivia Cheng on Facebook
 Olivia Cheng on Twitter

1979 births
Actresses from Edmonton
Living people
Canadian actresses of Chinese descent
Canadian film actresses
Canadian television reporters and correspondents
Canadian expatriate actresses in the United States
Canadian women television journalists
Journalists from Alberta